Scelotes mirus, the montane dwarf burrowing skink, is a species of lizard which is found in South Africa and Eswatini.

References

mirus
Reptiles of South Africa
Reptiles described in 1907
Taxa named by Jean Roux